Tomoplagia pallens is a species of tephritid or fruit flies in the genus Tomoplagia of the family Tephritidae.

References

Diptera of South America
insects described in 2004
Tephritinae